Famirul Asraf bin Sayuti (born 17 November 1989) is a Malaysian footballer who plays for Kelantan United in Malaysia M3 League. He is among 29 player that was called by Malaysia XI to play against Chelsea F.C. on 21 July 2011

Honours
Selangor FA
 The Sultan of Selangor's Cup:2012

Sime Darby F.C.
 Malaysia Premier League:Runner Up 2013

Personal life
He has a brother named Faizol Nazlin Sayuti who currently plays for Kelantan FA.

References

External links
 

1989 births
Living people
Malaysian people of Malay descent
Malaysian footballers
Malaysia international footballers
Kelantan FA players
Selangor FA players
Sri Pahang FC players
People from Kelantan
Melaka United F.C. players
Perlis FA players
Association football forwards 
Association football midfielders
Kelantan United F.C. players